No. 117 Helicopter Unit (Himalayan Dragons) is a Helicopter Unit and is equipped with [Chetak] and based at sarsawa Air Force Station.

History

Assignments

Aircraft
Chetak, Cheetah
HAL Dhruv

References

117